William Philip Gislingham (c. 1874 in London, England – 31 December 1957, in London, Middlesex, England) was a British music hall musician and  acrobat (part of the Famous Kellinos) and, using the name W. P. Kellino, film director. He founded Twickenham Studios. He was the father of the cinematographer Roy Kellino.

Selected filmography
 The Green Terror (1919)
 Alf's Button (1920)
 The Fordington Twins (1920)
 The Fall of a Saint (1920)
 Saved from the Sea (1920)
 The Autumn of Pride (1921)
 Rob Roy (1922)
 Young Lochinvar (1923)
 The Mating of Marcus (1926)
 Sailors Don't Care (1928)
 Smashing Through (1929)
 Alf's Carpet (1929)
 Alf's Button (1930)
 Who Killed Doc Robin? (1931)
 The Poisoned Diamond (1934)
 Royal Cavalcade (1935)
 Lend Me Your Wife (1935)
 Pay Box Adventure (1936)
 Hot News (1936)

References

External links
 

1873 births
1957 deaths
British film directors